Shuāngmiào (双庙) could refer to the following locations in China:

Towns 
 Shuangmiao, Anhui, in Taihe County
 Shuangmiao, Inner Mongolia, in Hanggin Rear Banner
 Shuangmiao, Shandong, in Xiajin County

Townships 
 Shuangmiao Township, Pingyu County, Henan
 Shuangmiao Township, Qingfeng County, Henan
 Shuangmiao Township, Xuchang, in Xiangcheng County, Henan
 Shuangmiao Township, Liaoning, in Zhangwu County
 Shuangmiao Township, Sichuan, in Da County
 Shuangmiao Township, Zhejiang, in Xianju County